Deal of the day services, also known as flash sales or one deal a day, are websites that offer a single product for sale for up to 24 hours.  For those sites that require membership, members may receive online offers and invitations in postal mail, email, through their daily deal aggregator  and/or social networks.

References

 
deal of the day services